This is a list of State Protected Monuments as officially reported by and available through the website of the Archaeological Survey of India in the Indian state Uttarakhand. The monument identifier is a combination of the abbreviation of the subdivision of the list (state, ASI circle) and the numbering as published on the website of the ASI. 21 State Protected Monuments have been recognized by the ASI in Uttarakhand.

List of state protected monuments 

|}

See also
 List of Monuments of National Importance in Uttarakhand

References 

Uttarakhand
State Protected Monuments
State Protected Monuments